Akio Takamori (1950 – 2017) was a Japanese-American ceramic sculptor and educator. Takamori often incorporates human forms into his creations.

Biography
Takamori was born in Nobeoka, Miyazaki, Japan on October 11, 1950. In Japan Takamori attended Musashino Art University. In 1974 he moved to the United States. He attended the Kansas City Art Institute (KCAI) and Alfred University.  In 1993 Takamori began his teaching career at the University of Washington where he taught until he retired in 2014 as professor emeritus. In 2001 Takamori received a Virginia A. Groot Foundation Award. In 2006 Takamori became a Fellow of the American Craft Council. The same year he was awarded a Joan Mitchell Foundation Painters and Sculptors Grant.

Takamori died on January 11, 2017, in Seattle, Washington.

Work
His work is in the collection of the Carnegie Museum of Art, the Los Angeles County Museum of Art, the Museum of Arts and Design, the Nelson-Atkins Museum of Art, the Victoria and Albert Museum, His work, Alice with Rose, was acquired by the Smithsonian American Art Museum as part of the Renwick Gallery's 50th Anniversary Campaign.

In 2000 the Racine Art Museum held a retrospective of his work. In 2022 the Vashon Center for the Arts held a retrospective of his work.

References

External links
 Akio Takamori on craft and being an artist in America video from Craft in America
 Akio Takamori's Drawings and Sculptures of Men Apologizing interview by Jen Graves in the Stranger

1950 births
Japanese sculptors
Japanese ceramists
American ceramists
People from Miyazaki Prefecture
Kansas City Art Institute alumni
2017 deaths